Edvard Stanislavovich Radzinsky (born September 23, 1936) is a Russian playwright, television personality, screenwriter, and the author of more than forty popular history books.

Biography
Edvard Stanislavovich Radzinsky was born in Moscow, Russia on September 23, 1936 to playwright Stanislav Radzinsky and his wife Sofia. He studied in the Moscow Archive Institute and is a trained historian.

In 1955 Radzinsky married actress Alla Geraskina, a daughter of popular Soviet playwright and writer Lia Geraskina. Their son Oleg was born in 1958. Radzinsky divorced Alla in 1964.

He later married Tatiana Doronina, one of the leading Soviet actresses of the 60s-70s. They divorced later. He is married to actress Elena Denisova.

Career
Radzinsky became a writer of popular non-fiction books on historical subjects, publishing more than forty. He has specialized in books about figures and times of Russian history. Since the 1990s, he has written the series Mysteries of History. Books translated into English include his biographies of Tsars Nicholas II and Alexander II, Rasputin, and Joseph Stalin.

His book Stalin: The First In-depth Biography Based on Explosive New Documents from Russia's Secret Archives (1997) was based on research in Russian and Soviet archives made newly available after 1991. He explored numerous controversies about Joseph Stalin, including the existence of a fuller text of Lenin's Testament, the alleged involvement of Stalin as an agent of the Tsarist secret police, and the role of Stalin in the death of his wife and the murder of Sergey Kirov.

According to Radzinsky, Stalin may have been poisoned by order of Lavrentiy Beria. His book includes an interview with a former bodyguard of Stalin, who stated that on the night of Stalin's death, the bodyguards were relieved of duty by an NKVD officer named Khrustalev. This same officer was briefly mentioned in Memories, the memoir of Stalin's daughter Svetlana Alliluyeva.

Radzinsky drew on documents from the archives to support the hypothesis by historian Viktor Suvorov that Stalin had prepared plans for a preemptive strike against Nazi Germany in 1941. As is known, Germany invaded the Soviet Union first.

Books

English
 Stalin: The First In-depth Biography Based on Explosive New Documents from Russia's Secret Archives, Anchor, (1997) 
 The Last Tsar : The Life and Death of Nicholas II, 1993, Anchor, (2005) 
 Alexander II: The Last Great Tsar (2005) 
 Tsar : The Lost World of Nicholas and Alexandra 
 The Rasputin File (2001, Anchor, USA) 
 Rasputin: The Last Word (2001, Allen & Unwin, Australia)

Russian
 «Ипатьевская ночь» © AST, 2007 г.
 «На Руси от ума одно горе» © AST, 2006 г.
 «Начало театрального романа»: Сборник пьес © Издательство «ВАГРИУС», 2004 г.
 Собрание сочинений (в восьми томах) © Издательство «ВАГРИУС», 1998—2003 г.
 «Загадки жизни и смерти». Подарочное издание © Издательство «ВАГРИУС»,2003 г.
 «Княжна Тараканова» © Издательство «ВАГРИУС», 2003 г.
 «Загадки истории». Подарочное издание © Издательство «ВАГРИУС», 2002 г.
 Napoleon: life after death «Наполеон: жизнь после смерти» © Издательство «ВАГРИУС», 2002 г.
 «Игры писателей» © Издательство «ВАГРИУС», 2001 г.
 «Загадки любви» © Издательство «ВАГРИУС», 1999, 2000 гг.
 «Загадки истории» © Издательство «ВАГРИУС», 1999, 2000 гг.
 «Кровь и призраки русской смуты» © Издательство «ВАГРИУС», 1998, 2000 гг.
 «Гибель галантного века» © Издательство «ВАГРИУС», 1999 г.
 «…и сделалась кровь» © Издательство «ВАГРИУС», 1998 г.
 «Властители дум» © Издательство «ВАГРИУС», 1999 г.
 «Театр» © Издательство «Искусство», 1986 г.
 Conversations with Socrates «Беседы с Сократом» © Издательство «Советский писатель», 1982 г.

References

External links

 His personal website

Russian dramatists and playwrights
Russian male dramatists and playwrights
Soviet dramatists and playwrights
Soviet male writers
20th-century male writers
Honorary Members of the Russian Academy of Arts
20th-century Russian historians
1936 births
Living people
Stalinism-era scholars and writers
International Writing Program alumni
Iran's Book of the Year Awards recipients
21st-century Russian historians